Svein Nymo (10 June 1953 – 15 August 2014) was a Norwegian violinist and composer from Målselv in Troms, and the son of the traditional Norwegian folk musician Johan Nymo.

Biography 
Nymo participated on many recordings with various artists, but is especially remembered for his participation in Ungdomslaget Ny Von (1978). Nymo was also the lead singer of the traditional folk music fusion project Nymoderne, who released the album of the same name in 1991.

Nymo started the NRK1 TV show Du skal høre mye... together with Tore Skoglund, and he also was co-author with Skoglund of the book Du skal flire mye før kjeften revner (1988).

Discography

As leader 
With Ny Von
1991: Nymoderne (Hot Club Records)

Collaborations 
With Malvin Skulbru
1982: Ikkje Så Mykje Men, Litt A´ Kvert.... (Trubadur)
1988: Sørgelige Sanger, Skrøpelige Dikt Og Sensuell  (Taraxacum Forlag)

With Rallarlaget
1986: Eld I Berget (Rallaren Musik Produktion)

With Ragnar Olsen & Sverre Kjeldsberg
1987: Den Glade Pessimisten (OK Produksjoner)

With Karlsøy Prestegaard
1994: Karlsøya - Mellom Geiter, Rock & Muhammed (OKKO ANS)

References

External links 
- Var ein banebrytande person 

20th-century Norwegian violinists
21st-century Norwegian violinists
Male violinists
Musicians from Troms
Hot Club Records artists
People from Målselv
1953 births
2014 deaths
20th-century Norwegian male musicians
21st-century Norwegian male musicians